"Cop Killer" is a song composed by Ernie C with lyrics by Ice-T for American heavy metal band Body Count, of which they were both members. Released on Body Count's 1992 self-titled debut album, the song was written two years earlier, and was partially influenced by "Psycho Killer" by Talking Heads.

The song's lyrics about "cop killing" provoked negative reactions from political figures of the time, such as then-President George H. W. Bush, as well as his vice-president Dan Quayle. Others defended the song on the basis of the band's First Amendment rights. 
Ice-T has referred to it as a "protest record". Ice-T eventually recalled the album and re-released it without the inclusion of the song, which was given away as a free single.

Background
Ice-T referred to "Cop Killer" as a "protest record," stating that the song is "[sung] in the first person as a character who is fed up with police brutality". Ice-T has also credited the Talking Heads song "Psycho Killer" with partially inspiring the song. "Cop Killer" was written in 1990, and had been performed live several times, including at the 1991 Lollapalooza tour, before it had been recorded in a studio.

The recorded version mentions then-Los Angeles police chief Daryl Gates, and Rodney King, a black motorist whose beating by LAPD officers had been caught on videotape. Shortly after the release of Body Count, a jury acquitted the officers and riots broke out in South Central Los Angeles. Soon after the riots, the  Dallas Police Association and the Combined Law Enforcement Association of Texas (CLEAT) launched a campaign to force Warner Bros. Records to withdraw the album.

Reaction
Following its release, the song was met with opposition, with critics ranging from President George H. W. Bush to various law enforcement agencies, with demands for the song's withdrawal from commercial availability, citing concerns of promoting anti-police sentiment. Ice-T defended the lyrical content of the song as did various other proponents who did not believe that the song posed any risk and remained in support of the song continuing to be released and sold.

Criticism and controversy
CLEAT (Combined Law Enforcement Associations of Texas) called for a boycott of all products by Time Warner in order to secure the removal of the song and album from stores. Within a week, they were joined by police organizations across the United States. Senators Daniel Patrick Moynihan, Lloyd Bentsen, and Al D'Amato protested Warner Records's release of the song by cancelling their planned cameo appearances in the 1993 Warner Bros. Pictures political film Dave. 

Some critics argued that the song could cause crime and violence. Dennis R. Martin (Former President, National Association of Chiefs of Police) argued that:

Defense of the song
Others defended the album on the basis of the group's right to freedom of speech, and cited the fact that Ice-T had portrayed a police officer in the 1991 film, New Jack City. Many people from the music world and other fields were supportive of the song. For example, in direct response to the criticism made by Dennis Martin above, Mark S. Hamm and Jeff Ferrell argued the following:

Ice-T stated of the song, "I'm singing in the first person as a character who is fed up with police brutality. I ain't never killed no cop. I felt like it a lot of times. But I never did it. If you believe that I'm a cop killer, you believe David Bowie is an astronaut".

In a July 1992 editorial in The Wall Street Journal defending his company's involvement with the song, Time Warner co-CEO Gerald M. Levin repeated this defense, writing that rather than "finding ways to silence the messenger", critics and listeners should be "heeding the anguished cry contained in his message".

The National Black Police Association opposed the boycott of Time Warner and the attacks on "Cop Killer", identifying police brutality as the cause of much anti-police sentiment, and proposing the creation of independent civilian review boards "to scrutinize the actions of our law enforcement officers" as a way of ending the provocations that caused artists such as Body Count "to respond to actions of police brutality and abuse through their music. ... Many individuals of the law enforcement profession do not want anyone to scrutinize their actions, but want to scrutinize the actions of others."

Further controversy and decision to withdraw song
Over the next month, controversy against the band grew. Vice President Quayle branded "Cop Killer" "obscene", and President Bush publicly denounced any record company that would release such a product. Body Count was removed from the shelves of a retail store in Greensboro, North Carolina, after local police had told the management that they would no longer respond to any emergency calls at the store if they continued to sell the album.

In July 1992, the New Zealand Police Commissioner unsuccessfully attempted to prevent an Ice-T concert in Auckland, arguing that "Anyone who comes to this country preaching in obscene terms the killing of police, should not be welcome here", before taking Body Count and Warner Bros. Records to the Indecent Publications Tribunal, in an effort to get it banned under New Zealand's Indecent Publications Act 1963. This was the first time in twenty years that a sound recording had come before the censorship body, and the first ever case involving popular music. After reviewing the various submissions, and listening carefully to the album, the Tribunal found the song "Cop Killer" to be "not exhortatory", saw the album as displaying "an honest purpose", and found Body Count not indecent.

At the July 1992 annual shareholders' meeting for Time Warner, actor Charlton Heston, who was a minor Time Warner shareholder, was given the opportunity to address the crowd, and, in a well publicized speech, recited lyrics from both "Cop Killer" and another song from Body Count, "KKK Bitch" – which namechecked PMRC head Tipper Gore – in an attempt to embarrass company executives into dropping the album.

Some death threats were sent to Warner Bros. Records executives, and some stockholders threatened to pull out of the company. According to his 1994 book The Ice Opinion: Who Gives a Fuck?, Ice-T decided to remove the song from the album of his own volition. Eventually, the album was re-issued with "Cop Killer" removed. Alongside the album's reissue, Warner Bros. issued "Cop Killer" as a free single. Ice-T left the label in 1993, following additional disputes over his solo album Home Invasion. The performer stated of the controversy that "When I started out, [Warner] never censored us. Everything we did, we had full control over. But what happened was when the cops moved on Body Count they issued pressure on the corporate division of Warner Bros., and that made the music division, they couldn't out-fight 'em in the battle, so even when you're in a business with somebody who might not wanna censor you, economically people can put restraints on 'em and cause 'em to be afraid. I learned that lesson in there, that you're never really safe as long as you're connected to any big corporation's money." Warner Bros. Records chairman Mo Ostin said in a 1994 interview with the Los Angeles Times, "(Time Warner) got so thin-skinned after the incident at the shareholders' meeting. In the end, Ice-T decided to leave because he could not allow tampering with his work. And I can't blame him—considering the climate." Expressing regret at the circumstances leading to Ice-T's departure, Ostin praised him as "a terrific artist who spoke the truth".

The studio version of "Cop Killer" has not been re-released, although a live version of the song appears on the 2005 release Body Count: Live in LA. According to Ernie C, the controversy over the song "still lingers for us, even now. I'll try to book clubs and the guy I'm talking to will mention it and I'll think to myself, 'Man, that was 17 years ago', but I meet a lot of bands who ask me about it too and I'm real respected by other artists for it. But it's a love/hate thing. Ice gets it too, even though he plays a cop on TV now on Law & Order SVU."

Track listing

References

External links
Ice T interview on the subject
Both sides of the debate
A music video for this song

1992 songs
Body Count (band) songs
Sire Records singles
Warner Records singles
Protest songs
Songs about death
Songs about police officers
Songs about police brutality
Criticism of police brutality
Law enforcement controversies in the United States
Obscenity controversies in music
African-American-related controversies
Police brutality in the United States
Songs against racism and xenophobia
Speed metal songs